Lynnwood is a historic house at 5 Linden Avenue in Wakefield, Massachusetts.  Built c. 1858, it is one of the town's finest examples of Stick style architecture.  It is a -story wood-frame structure with an L-shaped cross-gable configuration; its features include deep eaves supported by arched brackets, and a -story tower topped by a hip roof with triangular dormer windows.  Its eaves have brackets with pendants, and its windows have surrounds with drip molding.

The house was listed on the National Register of Historic Places in 1989.

See also
National Register of Historic Places listings in Wakefield, Massachusetts
National Register of Historic Places listings in Middlesex County, Massachusetts

References

Houses on the National Register of Historic Places in Wakefield, Massachusetts
Queen Anne architecture in Massachusetts
Houses completed in 1858
Houses in Wakefield, Massachusetts